Protestant Revolution may refer to:

Protestant Reformation, the 16th-century movement within Western Christianity
Protestant Revolution (Maryland), the political revolution that turned Maryland Protestant in 1689